This is the electoral history of Chris Christie, the former Governor of New Jersey.

Elections

2016
Christie formally launched his 2016 presidential campaign on June 30, 2015, at his high school in Livingston, New Jersey. He had already laid the groundwork for a presidential run by starting a PAC in 2015. He had already launched his campaign website on June 27. At the announcement he stated that both political parties had "failed our country", and called for more compromise in politics. "I am now ready to fight for the people," Christie said in his announcement speech. "I am proud to announce my candidacy for the Republican nomination for the presidency of the United States of America."

He spent considerable time in Iowa in 2014 laying groundwork. He had little expectation to win the Iowa caucus. He placed 10th in a field of 12 candidates with 1.8% of the ballots cast. Having claimed he would be "number one" of the state governors running, he came in 4th amongst governors.

Christie then shifted the focus of much of his campaign's effort in winning the New Hampshire Republican primary, for which a former Governor's Office staff member and political operative began working in winter 2014.  Christie campaigned extensively using a town meeting format, but in polls before the primary he slipped and fell behind. He spent 70 days in the state. In the New Hampshire debate he attacked candidate Marco Rubio. He placed sixth in a field of nine in the New Hampshire primary on February 9.

Christie subsequently endorsed Donald Trump on February 26, 2016 and began campaigning for him.

2013 
Christie easily won the Republican nomination, and he went on to defeat Democrat Buono in a landslide by 22 points after consistently leading in polling. As of 2022, this is the last time a Republican won the governorship of New Jersey or won any statewide election. This is also the last time the counties of Bergen, Burlington, Camden, Middlesex, Mercer, Passaic, and Union voted for the Republican candidate in a statewide election.

Christie was criticized for spending an additional $12–25 million of state money to hold a special election for United States Senator for New Jersey three weeks earlier on October 16, instead of simply holding the special election on November 5, concurrent with the already scheduled gubernatorial election. The Democratic nominee for the U.S. Senate was Newark mayor Cory Booker. Buono said it was hypocritical, speculating that Booker's presence on the ballot would attract more black and other minority voters who would be likely to vote for Buono.

Christie defeated Seth Grossman by an overwhelming margin in the Republican primary in June.

2009 
On January 8, 2009, Christie filed papers to run for governor. He won the primary and received the party's nomination.

On July 20, 2009, Christie announced that he had chosen Kimberly Guadagno, Monmouth County sheriff, to complete his campaign ticket as a candidate for lieutenant governor. Guadagno, who was elected sheriff in 2007, had previously served on the Monmouth Beach Board of Adjustment, and also as an assistant U.S. Attorney for the District of New Jersey.

Christie faced criticism for his acceptance of $23,800 in campaign contributions (and the resulting $47,600 in public finance matching funds) from a law firm that received a federal monitor contract while Christie served as the state's U.S. Attorney. In 2006, Christie approved a deferred prosecution agreement with the University of Medicine and Dentistry of New Jersey after it admitted committing Medicare fraud. He appointed Herbert Stern, a former federal judge and prosecutor, to the $500-per-hour post of federal monitor. Christie's close friend and fundraiser John Inglesino, a partner in Stern's law firm, was paid $325 per hour for his work as counsel on the monitorship. Stern's law firm, Stern and Killcullen, received reported more than $10 million in legal fees from the contract. Stern, Inglesino, a third partner, and their wives have since each made the maximum contribution of $3,400 to Christie's gubernatorial campaign.

On November 3, Christie defeated incumbent Democratic governor Jon Corzine by a margin of 48.5% to 44.9%, with 5.8% of the vote going to independent candidate Chris Daggett.

He chose not to move his family into Drumthwacket, the official governor's mansion and remained in Mendham, New Jersey.

In the primary on June 2, Christie won the Republican nomination with 55% of the vote, defeating conservative opponents Steve Lonegan (42%) and Rick Merkt (3%), the latter of whom was Christie's former running mate.

1997 
Christie finished behind John J. Murphy, fellow incumbent Frank J. Druetzler, and Cecilia G. Laureys, whom Christie and John C. O'Keeffe helped upset in 1994.

1995 
Christie, along with running mate Rick Merkt, challenged incumbent Anthony Bucco and Michael Carroll in the primary as a pro-choice candidate who supported a ban on assault weapons. Bucco and Carroll, the establishment candidates, defeated Christie and Merkt by a wide margin.

1994 
In 1994, Christie was elected as a Republican to the Board of Chosen Freeholders, or legislators, for Morris County, New Jersey, after he and a running mate, John C. O'Keeffe, defeated incumbent freeholders Cecilia G. Laureys and Edward A. Tamm in the Republican party primary.

References

Christie, Chris
Chris Christie
Christie, Chris